Marandi may refer to:
Alireza Marandi, Iranian physician
Babulal Marandi, Indian politician
Evi Marandi, Italian-Greek actress
Javad Marandi, British businessman
Louis Marandi, Indian politician
Mehdi Marandi, Iranian volleyballer
Mohammad Marandi, Iranian academic
Stephen Marandi, Indian politician
Tala Marandi, Indian politician
Som Marandi, Indian politician
Sudam Marandi,  Indian politician